This is a list of Luftwaffe personnel convicted of war crimes committed during World War II, including massacres, reprisals, and human experimentation.

Notes

References

Luftwaffe personnel convicted of war crimes
World War II-related lists